Chile Eboe-Osuji (born 2 September 1962) is a Distinguished International Jurist at the Lincoln Alexander School of Law and a Special Advisor to the President's Office at Toronto Metropolitan University. In his role at the Lincoln Alexander School of Law, Eboe-Osuji is leading discussions on the international human rights regime,  the international humanitarian law regime, the role of international courts/tribunals, and the rule of law. He will also play a key role in advancing Lincoln Alexander Law's international profile through teaching initiatives, programmatic collaborations, and public discourse. Prior to joining the law school, Eboe-Osuji served as the President of the International Criminal Court, The Hague from March 2018 to March 2021. The Nigerian-born Eboe-Osuji was also concurrently serving as a senior judge in the Appeals Division of the ICC during this time. Prior to his work with the International Criminal Court, he was the Legal Advisor to the United Nations High Commissioner for Human Rights in Geneva. He also served at various times as a senior prosecutor at both the International Criminal Tribunal for Rwanda and the Special Court for Sierra Leone.

Early life and education
Eboe-Osuji was born in Anara, Isiala Mbano, Imo State, Nigeria, on 2 September 1962. He obtained his bachelor of laws degree from the University of Calabar, Nigeria, master of laws degree from McGill University, Montreal, Quebec, Canada, and doctor of laws degree from the University of Amsterdam, the Netherlands.

Career
Eboe-Osuji was called to the Nigerian Bar in 1986 and practised briefly there. After obtaining his master of laws degree from McGill in 1991, he worked as a barrister in Canada, having been called to the Bar in Ontario and in British Columbia in 1993.

From 1997 to 2005, Eboe-Osuji worked at the International Criminal Tribunal for Rwanda as prosecution counsel and senior legal officer to the judges of the tribunal. From 2005 to 2007, he worked in Canada as a barrister and law lecturer. Working for the Special Court for Sierra Leone as senior prosecution appeals counsel in 2007/08 and returning to the ICTR from 2008 to 2010 as Head of Chambers, he became the Legal Advisor to the United Nations High Commissioner for Human Rights Navi Pillay in 2010, and held a cross-appointment as the principal prosecution appeals counsel at the Special Court for Sierra Leone, in the case of Charles Taylor, the former President of Liberia. He has authored two books and numerous law journal articles in international law.

Judge of the International Criminal Court, 2012 - 2021
On 16 December 2011, Eboe-Osuji was elected as a judge of the International Criminal Court. He won the office in the fifteenth ballot in the Assembly of States Parties. He took office on 11 March 2012.

From September 2013, Eboe-Osuji – alongside Judges Olga Venecia Herrera Carbuccia and Robert Fremr – presided over the trial against Deputy President William Ruto of Kenya, who was accused of stoking a wave of killing for political gain after the country's contested 2007 elections. Early on, he warned Kenyan media and bloggers that anyone revealing the identity of a protected witness at the Ruto trial could be guilty of contempt of court; ICC chief prosecutor Fatou Bensouda had previously complained that some witnesses were being intimidated in Kenya, some of whom withdrew from the case.

Following Eboe-Osuji's own request, the Presidency of the ICC decided to reconstitute Trial Chamber V(b) in the trial against Uhuru Muigai Kenyatta and replace him with Judge Geoffrey Henderson in early 2014. However, Eboe-Osuji remains the Presiding Judge in Trial Chamber V(a) which continues to hear the case against Ruto and former Kass FM broadcaster Joshua Sang. In April 2014, his chamber issued subpoenas for several prosecution witnesses no longer willing to testify in the case. Shortly after, Eboe-Osuji told off the government of Kenya for turning to the principle of sovereignty "at every convenient opportunity, with the evident aim of frightening judges".

Other activities
 On April 28, 2022, Eboe-Osuji joined The Right Honourable Kim Campbell, The Right Honourable Beverley McLachlin and The Honourable Bob Rae on a panel to discuss "Canada's Place on the World Stage".
 Distinguished International Jurist, (Lincoln Alexander School of Law at Toronto Metropolitan University) 
 International Gender Champions (IGC), Member

References

1962 births
Living people
International Criminal Court judges
McGill University Faculty of Law alumni
University of Calabar alumni
University of Amsterdam alumni
Nigerian judges
People from Imo State
Nigerian judges of international courts and tribunals
Presidents of the International Criminal Court